Brooks Turner Moore is an American television narrator who has primarily provided voiceovers for programs broadcast on the Discovery Channel and its related networks.  His most prominent work is narrating How It's Made for broadcast in the United States. Although he was replaced by Zac Fine in the 9th and 10th seasons (2007–2008), Moore returned for the 11th season (2008–2009) following a fan petition to bring him back. He remains the show's narrator to this day. Moore also narrated How It's Made Dream Cars on  Science Channel, as well as Judge Faith and works in the fields of directing and producing.

External links
Brooks Moore's production company site
 
 Brooks Moore's Reddit AMA (ask me anything) from January, 2016

Year of birth missing (living people)
Living people
American male voice actors